Mountain View Park is a large park in Middlesex, Middlesex County, New Jersey, that surrounds Middlesex High School. The main road in and out of the park is Route 28 / Bound Brook Road.

Bound Brook joins the Green Brook at the northwest corner of Mountain View Park. The brook then flows south before the Ambrose Brook joins it near Lincoln Boulevard. It then flows into the Raritan River in Middlesex at an elevation of 19 feet.

Facilities
Public facilities in Mountain View Park include:
Two gazebos 
Two playgrounds 
Horseshoe pits
Numerous basketball courts
Numerous tennis courts
Middlesex Community Pool
Memorial Field
Model-airplane strip
Barbecue grills
Numerous park benches
Baseball field
Softball field
Three soccer fields

Parks in Middlesex County, New Jersey
Model airplane fields